The first Finnish presidential election was held in 1919. Presidential elections have been held every six years since.

Current parliamentary parties

Centre Party
Centre Party (1906–1965 Agrarian League, 1965–1988 Center)  candidates

National Coalition Party
National Coalition Party candidates

Christian Democrats
Christian Democrats (1958–2001 Finnish Christian League) candidates

True Finns
True Finns candidates

Swedish People's Party
Swedish People's Party candidates

Social Democratic Party
Social Democratic Party candidates

Left Alliance

Left Alliance candidates

Green League
Green League candidates

Other

Democratic Alternative
Democratic Alternative candidates

National Progressive Party
National Progressive Party candidates

Patriotic People's Movement
Patriotic People's Movement candidates

Liberal People's Party
Liberal People's Party candidates

Constitutional Right Party
Constitutional Right Party  candidates

Reform Group
Reform Group candidates

People's Democratic League
People's Democratic League candidates

People's Unity Party
People's Unity Party candidates

Movement 88
Movement 88 candidates

Rural Party
Rural Party candidates

Socialist parliament group
Socialist parliament group candidates

Socialist  Workers and Smallholders Group
Socialist  Workers and Smallholders Group candidates

People's Party
People's Party's candidates

Social Democratic Union of Workers and Smallholders
Social Democratic Union of Workers and Smallholders candidates

Liberal League
Liberal League  candidates

Independents
Independent candidates

Presidential elections in Finland
Candidates for President of Finland